This is a list of canard aircraft, having a foreplane in front of the main wing instead of a conventional tailplane.

|-
| AASI Jetcruzer || USA || Jet || Transport || 1989 || Prototype || 5 || Pusher configuration. 
|-
| AEA June Bug || USA || Propeller || Experimental || 1908 || Prototype || 1 || 
|-
| AeroCad AeroCanard || USA || Propeller || Private ||  || Homebuilt || 24 || Pusher propeller.
|-
| ALR Piranha || Switzerland || Jet || Multi-role fighter || 1980 || Project || 0 || 
|-
| Ambrosini SS.4 || Italy || Propeller || Fighter || 1939 || Prototype || 1 || Pusher propeller. 
|-
| ASL monoplane No.1 || UK || Propeller || Experimental || 1909 || Prototype ||  || Pusher propeller.
|-
| ASL monoplane No.2 || UK || Propeller || Experimental || 1910 || Prototype ||  || Pusher propeller.
|-
| ASL Valkyrie || UK || Propeller || Private || 1910 || Production || ~11 || Mid-engined pusher configuration, with propeller in front of wing. Several variants.
|-
| Atlas Cheetah || South Africa || Jet || Fighter || 1986 || Production || 70 || Modified Dassault Mirage III airframes. Several variants.
|-
| Aviafiber Canard 2FL || Switzerland || Glider || Private || 1978 || Production ||  || Foot-launched. The pilot was accommodated inside a fuselage and withdrew their legs through a hatch in the underside.
|-
| Avro 730 || UK || Jet || Bomber || 1957 || Project || 0 || Mach 3 performance.
|-
| Avtek 400 || USA || Propeller || Transport || 1984 || Prototype || 1 || Pusher configuration.
|-
| Beech Starship || USA || Propeller || Transport || 1986 || Production || 53 || Pusher configuration.
|-
| Beltrame Colibri || Italy || Propeller || Private || 1938 || Prototype || 1 || 
|-
| Besson canard || France || Propeller || Private || 1911 || Prototype || 1 || 
|-
| Berkut 360 || USA || Propeller || Private || 1989 || Homebuilt || 31 || 
|-
| Blériot V || France || Propeller || Experimental || 1907 || Prototype || 1 || Pusher configuration.
|-
| Chengdu J-9 || China || Jet || Fighter || 1975 || Project || 0 || 
|-
| Chengdu J-10 || China || Jet || Fighter || 1998 || Production || 468 || 
|-
| Chengdu J-20 || China || Jet || Fighter || 2011 || Production || 150 || 
|-
| Chudzik CC-1 || France || Propeller || Private || 1987 || Prototype || 1 || 
|-
| Cosy Classic || USA || Propeller || Private || || Homebuilt ||  || Variant of the Cozy III, Europeanised by Uli Wolter. The Çapar Mechanical Engineering company produced at least one example in Turkey.
|-
| Cozy || USA || Propeller || Private ||  || Homebuilt ||  || 
|-
| Cozy III || USA || Propeller || Private || 1982 || Homebuilt ||  || 
|-
| Cozy MK IV || USA || Propeller || Private || 1993 || Homebuilt ||  || 
|-
| Curtiss-Wright XP-55 Ascender || USA || Propeller || Fighter || 1943 || Prototype || 3 || Pusher configuration. 
|-
| Dassault Mirage III || France || Jet || Fighter || 1981 || Production || || Variant with a small close-coupled canard.
|-
| Dassault Rafale || France || Jet || Fighter || 1986 || Production || 201 || 
|-
| Diehl AeroNautical XTC Hydrolight || USA || Propeller || Amphibious Ultralight || 1980s || Kit ||  ||
|-
| Dixon Nipper || UK || Propeller || Experimental || 1911 || Prototype || 1 ||
|-
| e-Go || UK || Propeller || Private || 2013 || Prototype || 1 ||   
|-
| Eipper Lotus Microlight || USA || Propeller || || 1982 ||  ||  || 
|-
| Eurofighter Typhoon || International || Jet || Multi-role fighter|| 1994 || Production || 571 || 
|-
| Fabre Hydravion || France || Propeller || Experimental || 1910 || Prototype || 1 || First airworthy seaplane.
|-
| Focke-Wulf F 19 || Germany || Propeller || Experimental || 1927 || Prototype || 2 || 
|-
| Focke-Wulf Fw 42 || Germany || Propeller || Bomber || 1932 || Project || 0 || Twin-engined.
|-
| Freedom Aviation Phoenix || USA || Propeller || Homebuilt || 2007 || Prototype || 1 || 
|-
| Grumman X-29 || USA || Jet || Experimental || 1984 || Prototype || 2 || Forward-Swept wing experimental aircraft.
|-
| Gyroflug Speed Canard || Germany || Propeller || Sports plane || 1980 || Production || 62 || 
|-
| IAI Kfir C2 || Israel || Jet || Fighter || 1974 || Production || 220+ || Modified Dassault Mirage 5 airframes. Several variants.
|-
| IAI Lavi || Israel || Jet || Fighter || 1986 || Project || 0 || 
|-
| Junqua Ibis || France || Propeller || Homebuilt || 1991 || Operational || 11 || 
|-
| Kyūshū J7W1 Shinden || Japan || Propeller || Fighter || 1945 || Prototype || 2 || Pusher configuration. 
|-
| Latécoère 225 || France || Propeller || Ultralight Amphibious || 1984 || Prototype ||1 || Pusher configuration.
|-
| Lippisch Ente || Germany || Rocket || Experimental || 1928 || Prototype || 1 || First rocket powered aircraft.
|-
| Lockheed L-133 || USA || Jet || Fighter || 1942 || Project || 0 || 
|-
| MacCready Gossamer Condor || USA || Propeller || Experimental || 1977 || Operational || 1 || Human-powered aircraft.
|-
| MacCready Gossamer Albatross || USA || Propeller || Experimental || 1979 || Operational || 1 || Human-powered aircraft. 
|-
| MacCready Gossamer Penguin || USA || Propeller || Experimental || 1979 || Operational || 1 || Solar-powered aircraft. 
|-
| Messerschmitt P.1110 Ente || Germany || Jet || Fighter || 1945 || Project || 0 || Proposed for the Emergency Fighter Program
|-
| MiG-8 Utka || USSR || Propeller || Experimental || 1945 || Prototype || 1 || 
|-
| North American X-10 || USA || Jet || Experimental || 1953 || Operational || 13 || 
|-
| North American SM-64 Navaho || USA || UAV || Attack || 1957 || Production ||  || Cruise missile.
|-
| North American XB-70 Valkyrie || USA || Jet || Bomber || 1964 || Prototype || 2 || Mach 3 performance, "waverider" wing.
|-
| Novi Avion || Yugoslavia || Jet || Multi-role || 1991 || Project ||  || 
|-
| OMAC Laser 300 || USA || Propeller || Transport || 1981 ||  || 3 || Pusher configuration.
|-
| Peterson Kenai || Propeller || Private || || 2014 || Production ||  || 
|-
| Piaggio P.180 Avanti || Italy || Propeller || Executive transport  || 1986 || Production ||  || 
|-
| Pterodactyl Ascender || USA || Propeller || || 1980 ||  ||  || Variant with a canard foreplane.
|-
| Qaher-313 || Iran || Jet || Fighter || 2013 || Project ||  || 
|-
| Rockwell-MBB X-31 || USA/Germany || Jet || Experimental || 1990 || Prototype || 2 || 
|-
| Roe I Biplane || UK || Propeller || Experimental || 1908 || Prototype ||1  || 
|-
| Royal Aircraft Factory S.E.1 || UK || Propeller || Experimental || 1911 || Prototype || 1 || 
|-
| Rutan Amsoil Racer || USA || Propeller || Experimental || 1981 || Prototype || 1 || 
|-
| Rutan Defiant || USA || Propeller || || 1978 ||  ||  || 
|-
| Rutan Long-EZ || USA || Propeller || || 1979 || Homebuilt ||  || 
|-
| Rutan Solitaire || USA || Glider || || 1982 ||Homebuilt ||  || Self-launching motor glider.
|-
| Rutan VariEze || USA || Propeller || Private || 1975 || Homebuilt ||  || 
|-
| Rutan VariViggen || USA || Propeller || Private || 1972 || Homebuilt ||  || 
|-
| Rutan Voyager || USA || Propeller || Experimental || 1986 || Operational || 1 || Round-the-world special.
|-
| Saab 37 Viggen || Sweden || Jet || Fighter || 1967 || Production || 329 || 
|-
| Saab JAS 39 Gripen || Sweden || Jet || Fighter || 1988 || Production || 271 || 
|-
| Santos-Dumont 14-bis || France || Propeller || Experimental || 1906 || Prototype || 1 || 
|-
| Scaled Composites ARES || USA || Jet || Experimental || 1990 || Prototype || 1 || 
|-
| Shenyang J-15 || China || Jet || Fighter || 2009 || Production || 50 || 
|-
| Sukhoi Su-33 || USSR || Jet || Fighter || 1987 || Production || 33 || 
|-
| Sukhoi T-4 || USSR || Jet || Bomber || 1972 || Prototype || 4 || Mach 3 performance.
|-
| Tupolev Tu-144 || USSR || Jet || Transport || 1968 || Production ||  || SST. Canard "moustache".
|-
| Sukhoi Su-34 || Russia || Jet || fighter-bomber || 1990 || Production ||  || 
|-
| Sukhoi Su-30 MKI || Russia-India || Jet || Fighter || 1989 || Production ||  || License-built variant of the Sukhoi Su-30.
|-
| Sukhoi Su-37 || Russia || Jet || Fighter || 1996 || Prototype || || 
|-
| Sukhoi Su-47 || Russia || Jet || Experimental || 1997 || Prototype ||  || Main wing is forward-swept.
|-
| Velocity SE || USA || Propeller || || || ||  || 
|-
| Velocity XL || USA || Propeller || || || ||  || 
|-
| Archdeacon Glider || France || Glider || Experimental || 1904 || Prototype || 1 || 
|-
| Voisin Canard || France || Propeller || || 1911 ||  ||  || 
|-
| Wright Glider || USA || Glider || Experimental || 1902 || Prototype || 1 || 
|-
| Wright Flyer || USA || Propeller || Experimental || 1903 || Prototype || 1 || 
|-
| Wright Stagger-Ez || USA || Propeller || || || ||  || Three-seat modification of the Rutan Long-EZ.
|}

References

See also
Eurocanard

canard
Canard aircraft